Dave Smeds is an American science fiction writer.  To date he has written eleven books and over one hundred short stories.

Bibliography

War of the Dragons series
The Sorcery Within (1985)
The Schemes of Dragons (1989)

Novels
Sinking Ship (1987)
Goats (1987)
The Law of the Jungle (1998) - X-Men series
Piper in the Night (2001)

Short story collections
Earthly Pleasures: The Erotic Science Fiction (1996)
Embracing the Starlight (2002)
Short Stories, Volume 1 (2003)
Short Stories, Volume 2 (2003)

Short stories
His short story "Dragon Touched" appeared in Dragons of Light edited by Orson Scott Card.

Non fiction
Chuck Norris: Martial Arts Masters (2001)

External links

20th-century American novelists
21st-century American novelists
American fantasy writers
American male novelists
American science fiction writers
1955 births
Living people
American male short story writers
20th-century American short story writers
21st-century American short story writers
20th-century American male writers
21st-century American male writers